Hvis lyset tar oss (Norwegian for If the Light Takes Us) is the third studio album by Norwegian black metal solo project Burzum. It was recorded in September 1992, but was not released until April 1994, whereupon it was released through Misanthropy Records and Vikernes' own record label, Cymophane Productions.

Background
Varg Vikernes recorded the first four Burzum albums between January 1992 and March 1993 at the Grieg Hall in Bergen. However, the releases were spread out, with many months between the recording and the release of each album. During this time, Vikernes became a part of the early Norwegian black metal scene and befriended Mayhem guitarist Euronymous. The two developed a feud that culminated in Vikernes  stabbing Euronymous to death in his apartment building in Oslo during August 1993. Vikernes was arrested a few days later and, in May 1994, was sentenced to 21 years (the maximum sentence in Norway) in prison for murder and several church arsons.

The album cover features a drawing by 19th-century artist Theodor Kittelsen named Fattigmannen (The Pauper). Vikernes dedicated the album to Fenriz of fellow Norwegian black metal band Darkthrone and Demonaz from Norwegian black metal band Immortal; however, in an interview in 2010, he expressed regret for the dedication to Demonaz and claimed Demonaz was "a rat like no other". Promotional copies sent to fanzines included the song "Et hvitt lys over skogen" (Norwegian for "A White Light Over the Forest") instead of "Tomhet". "Et hvitt lys over skogen" later appeared on the 1998 compilation album Presumed Guilty.

According to Vikernes, Hvis lyset tar oss is a concept album, about:

[...] what once was, before the light took us and we rode into the castle of the dream. Into emptiness. It's something like: beware the Christian light, it will take you away into degeneracy and nothingness. What others call light I call darkness. Seek the darkness and hell and you will find nothing but evolution.

Reception

Kelefa Sanneh wrote, "it starts with three long and smudgy midtempo songs, with rudimentary guitar-playing and vocals that sound like screams from down the hall; the mood is grim but also rather wistful, especially during the fourth and final track, an atmospheric keyboard piece that last fourteen minutes."

Track listing

Personnel

 Count Grishnackh (Varg Vikernes) – vocals, guitar, keyboard, synthesizer, drums, bass, production
Pytten – production

References

Burzum albums
1994 albums
Concept albums
Misanthropy Records albums
Norwegian-language albums